Jadwiga "Jed" Jędrzejowska (15 October 1912 – 28 February 1980) was a Polish tennis player who had her main achievements during the second half of the 1930s. Because her name was difficult to pronounce for many people who did not speak Polish, she was often called by the nicknames "Jed" or "Ja-Ja".

Career
Jędrzejowska, a baseline player with a strong forehand, reached the singles final of a Grand Slam tournament on three occasions, a record for Polish tennis. In 1937 she lost in three sets to Dorothy Round in the Wimbledon final and at the U.S. Championships later that year she was defeated in the final  by Anita Lizana. In 1939 she was a runner-up at the French Championships, losing in the final to Simonne Mathieu in straight sets.

In women's doubles, Jędrzejowska won the 1939 French Championships with Mathieu, defeating Alice Florian and Hella Kovac in the final in two sets. Three years earlier Jędrzejowska's and Susan Noel were runners-up at the French Championships, losing the final to Mathieu and Billie Yorke. At the 1938 U.S. Championships Jędrzejowska and Mathieu lost the final to the American pair Alice Marble and Sarah Palfrey Cooke. In the mixed doubles final at the 1947 French Championships, Jędrzejowska and Cristea Caralulis lost to Eric Sturgess and Sheila Summers without winning a game. At the age of 44, Jędrzejowska reached the women's doubles quarterfinals of the 1957 French Championships with partner Pilar Barril.

She won four consecutive singles titles at the London Championships between 1936 and 1939. Jędrzejowska won the singles event at the Kent Championships in 1937 and 1938 and additionally won singles titles at the country championships of Ireland (1932), Austria (1934) and Wales (1932, 1935 and 1936).

According to A. Wallis Myers and John Olliff of The Daily Telegraph and The Daily Mail, Jędrzejowska was ranked in the world top 10 from 1936 through 1939 (no rankings issued from 1940 through 1945), reaching a career high of world No. 3 in 1937.

Personal life
Jędrzejowska married Alfred Gallert in 1947.

Grand Slam finals

Singles: 3 (3 runners-up)

Doubles: 3 (1 title, 2 runners-up)

Mixed doubles: 1 (1 title)

Grand Slam singles tournament timeline

R = tournament restricted to French nationals and held under German occupation.

1In 1946 and 1947, the French Championships were held after Wimbledon.

See also
 Ignacy Tłoczyński
 Performance timelines for all female tennis players who reached at least one Grand Slam final

Notes

References

External links

 Le coup droit (French site, Jedrzejowska's tennis style appears in "Pologne")

1912 births
1980 deaths
Sportspeople from Kraków
Polish female tennis players
French Championships (tennis) champions
Grand Slam (tennis) champions in women's doubles
20th-century Polish women